Derrius Damon Thompson (born July 5, 1977) is a former American football wide receiver in the National Football League for the Washington Redskins and the Miami Dolphins. He played college football at Baylor University.  He graduated from Cedar Hill High School in Cedar Hill, Texas, in 1995.

1977 births
Living people
Players of American football from Dallas
American football wide receivers
Baylor Bears football players
Washington Redskins players
Miami Dolphins players